Hobie is a name or nickname.

People with the given name 
 Hobie Call (born 1977), American obstacle course racer
 Hobie Verhulst (born 1993), Dutch professional footballer

People with the nickname 
 Hobart Alter (1933–2014), creator of the Hobie Cat catamaran and a founding pioneer in the surfboard shaping industry
 Hobie Billingsley, American diver and coach, member of the International Swimming Hall of Fame
 Gregg "Hobie" Hubbard, keyboard player for Sawyer Brown
 Hobie Kitchen (born 1904), Canadian National Hockey League player
 Hobie Landrith (born 1930), American Major League Baseball catcher
 J-Hope (born 1994), member of the popular K-pop band BTS

Fictional characters with the name 
 Hobie Brown, the first Prowler, a Marvel Comics superhero
 Hobie Buchannon, from the TV series Baywatch
 Hobie Doyle, from the Coen Brothers’ movie Hail, Caesar!
 James "Hobie" Hobart, from Donna Tart’s novel The Goldfinch

See also 
 Hobey Baker (1892–1918), American hockey and football player, the only person in both the Hockey and College Football Halls of Fame

Nicknames